Marlene Wayar (born 14 October 1968) is an Argentine social psychologist, travesti-transgender activist, and author of the book Travesti: una teoría lo suficientemente buena (Cross-dressing [Travesti]: A Good Enough Theory).

Biography
Marlene Wayar is the general coordinator of Futuro Transgenerico - an organization with which she was part of the National Front for the Gender Identity Law – and co-founder of the Silvia Rivera Trans Network of Latin America and the Caribbean.

She is the director of El Teje, the first travesti newspaper in Latin America, developed from a workshop held at the Ricardo Rojas Cultural Center.

She is one of the founders of the Nadia Echazú Textile Cooperative, a workshop-school named in honor of the trans rights activist. The project was inaugurated in mid 2008, in a location donated by the National Institute of Associations and Social Economy (INAES).

Wayar was host of the series Género identidad. La diversidad en el cine (Gender Identity: Diversity in the Cinema), broadcast by Encuentro in 2011.

Awards and distinctions
A few weeks into the Trans Literacy Center's second year, the Popular Library of Gender, Sexual Affective Diversity, and Human Rights of the Argentine province of Tucumán (CRISÁLIDA) reported that, as a result of a poll, alumni and participants proposed adding "Marlene Wayar" to the center's name. This was accepted unanimously by the organization's Directive Commission and announced to the Network of Women of Tucumán (co-participants of the project).

Publications
 Travesti: una teoría lo suficientemente buena (2018), Editorial Muchas Nueces,

References

External links
  

1968 births
21st-century Argentine women writers
21st-century Argentine writers
Argentine psychologists
Argentine LGBT rights activists
Argentine LGBT writers
Living people
People from Córdoba, Argentina
Social psychologists
Transgender rights activists
Argentine women psychologists
Travestis